Hadeninae was formerly a subfamily of the moth family Noctuidae, but was merged into the subfamily Noctuinae. The tribes Apameini, Caradrinini, Elaphriini, Episemini, Eriopygini, Hadenini, Leucaniini, Orthosiini, and Xylenini were moved from Hadeninae to Noctuinae.

References

 
Noctuidae
Obsolete arthropod taxa